Egypt contains a large number of palaces, dating from the time of the Pharaohs, through the Romans, Fatimids, Memluks, and the modern Egyptian kingdom.

Pharaonic 

 16th century BC palace of an unknown king, Ballas
 14th century BC palace of Amenhotep III in Malkata (or Malqata), Luxor
 1346 BC Amarna palaces of the Pharaoh Akhenaten in al-Minya
 14th century BC Amenhotep III palace at Avaris (Pi-Ramesses) in the Eastern Desert
 13th century BC palace of the Pharaoh Merenptah in Memphis, Egypt
 13th century BC palace of Rameses II, Ramesseum, Luxor
 13th century BC palace of Rameses II, Fayoum 
 1175 BC The temple and palace of Rameses III at Medinet Habu
 6th century BC palace of Wahibre (Apries) in Memphis, Egypt

Ptolemaic 
 Circa 2nd century BC The Ptolemaic palace in what is now Silsila district in Alexandria
 50s BC Caesareum palace which was built by Cleopatra in honor of Julius Caesar or Mark Antony in Alexandria
 50s BC Antirhodos island palace, was erected off of Alexandria's mainland in the Eastern Harbour.(later on was submerged by sea)

Roman 
 100 AD Roman palace at El Haiz area in the Bahariya Oasis, western desert.

Islamic
 870 AD Ahmad ibn Tulun Palace at al-Qatta'i in Old Cairo.
 12th century AD Fatimid Great Palaces (the Great Eastern Palace and the Western Palace) around the Bayn al-Qasrayn area in Historic Cairo.
 12th century Cairo Citadel, an Ayyubid dynasty palace
 13th century Sultan al-Salih palace in Rhoda Island in Nile in  Cairo.
 13th century The Ablaq Palace of Al-Nasir Mohamed Ibn Qalawun, in Old Cairo.
 1293 Amir Khayrbak Palace or Amir Alin Aq Palace at Bab al-Wazir Street, Tabbana Quarter, Old Cairo.
 14th century Palace of Manjak al Yusufi al Silahdar, Cairo Egypt.
 1330 Amir Qawsun Palace (Qawsoun Yashbak min Mahdi) in Cairo, Egypt
 1334 Beshtak Palace
 1352 Amir Taz Palace in Cairo Egypt
 1366 Palace of Emir Tashtimur (Hummus Akhdar) in Cairo, Egypt
 15th century The Ghouri Palace 
 1496 Amir Mamay Palace (Bait al-Qady)
 16th century Bayt Al-Razzaz palace or Palace of al-Ashraf Qaytbay. Darb Al-Ahmer.
 1634 House of Gamal al-Din al-Dhahabi, Al-Ghoureya
 18th century Kasr Alaini (which later became a Cairo University hospital building)
 1731 Harawi Residence
 1779 Al Musafir Khana Palace (Kasr El Chok), at al-Jamaliyya, Old Cairo. The birthplace of Khedive Ismail, it was destroyed by fire in 1998.
 1790s Mohammed Bey al-Alfi Palace (where Napoleon lived during his Egyptian campaign).
 1794 Bayt al-Sinnari (Palace). Now a museum.

Modern Egypt 
 19th century Bulaq palace of Ismail Pasha in Giza
 19th century Mena House built by Khedive Ismail, at Giza near pyramids.
 19th century Kasr al-Nozha, the Cattaui (Egyptian Jewish industrialist) palace in Shubra
 19th century Kasr al-Incha (now the ministry of defense).
 19th century Kasr Kamal al-Din (former residence of the ministry of foreign affairs)
 19th century Zaafarana palace (now the Ain Shams University administration building)
 19th century Medhat Yegen Pasha's palace, Garden city, Cairo.(Demolished now)
 19th century Mahmoud Sami el-Baroudi palace in Giza now demolished
 19th century Kasr al-Aali
 19th century Kasr al-Mounira that became the French archeological center (IFAO).
 19th century Kasr al-Amira Iffet Hassan that was later purchased by Princess Shuvekar Ibrahim before becoming the official seat of the council of ministers.
 19th century El-Walda Pasha palace (now demolished).
 1807 Muhammad Ali's Shubra Palace (Ain Shams faculty of agriculture)
 1827 Harem Palaces at the Citadel of Cairo.(now the Military museum)
 1850s Kasr al-Ismailia. Now abolished it was in the area of the Mogama El-Tahrir government complex.
 1860s Khairy Pasha palace was minister of education. (It became the campus of the American University in Cairo in the 1920s)
 1814 Al-Gawhara Palace at Cairo citadel
 1854 Kasr al-Nil (now demolished but the area in downtown Cairo still carries its name) 
 1863 Gezirah Palace(now a private hotel)
 1863 Abdeen Palace - former royal residence, Cairo
 1897 Count Gabriel Habib El-Sakakini Pasha Palace at Old Cairo
 1898 Anisa Wissa Palace, Fayoum.
 1899 Prince Mohammed Ali Tewfik palace (now the Manyal Palace museum)
 1899 Prince Said Halim Pasha Palace in downtown Cairo.
 late 19th century Koubbeh Palace, El-Quba
 20th century Fouad Serageddin Pasha's palace, Garden city.
 20th century EL-Dobara palace (now a government school)
 20th century Tahra palace, El-Zayton
 1901 The Palace of Saad Zaghloul Pasha (Beit El-Omma Museum)
 1911 Baron Empain palace
 1910 Heliopolis Palace, Heliopolis, Cairo 
 1915 Mohammed Mahmoud Khalil palace (now a museum)
 1919 Princess Fatma Al-Zahra' Palace, Alexandria, now royal jewelry museum
1920s Prince Amr Ibrahim Palace, Zamalek (now the Museum of Islamic Ceramics)
 1924 Kurmet Ibn Hani' (Ahmed Shawki museum).
 Unknown (Before 1939) Prince Yousef Kamal Palace at Ain Shams district, now Desert research institute.
 Montaza Palace, Alexandria
 Ras Al-Teen Palace, Alexandria

Others 
 Qaroun Palace (Qasr Qaroun) is a Ptolemaic temple in Fayoum.
 Hatshepsut's Palace is Deir el-Bahri Hatshepsut's temple.

References

External links 
egy.com - List of palaces on the Nile
Palaces of Pashas

Palaces
Palaces
Egypt